Celastrina oreas  is a small butterfly found in the East Palearctic (Ussuri, China, Nepal, Assam, Burma, Taiwan) that belongs to the lycaenids or blues family.

Description from Seitz

C. oreas Leech (83 f). Male  somewhat similar to the male of argiolus, but deeper violet-blue and the black apical area of the wings broader. The female too, is darker, being more purplish blue, the underside bearing fewer, but very strongly marked elongate spots. — In West China, up to 10, 000 ft.

Biology
The larva on  feeds on Prinsepia chinensis, Prinsepia scandens, Eurya strigillosa, E. acuminata, E. groffii, Prinsepia scandens

See also
List of butterflies of Russia

References

Celastrina
Butterflies described in 1893